The United Kingdom Roller Derby Association (UKRDA) was the member-led National Association for roller derby in the UK, with the aim of promoting and lobbying for the sport. The association was formed in 2008 but formalised in 2010 with 14 member leagues and in February 2011, it was recognised by the British Roller Sports Federation. 

In June 2021, an EGM was held to discuss the closure of the association due to inadequate support for the organisation's running. It was disbanded shortly thereafter.

The UKRDA had a cooperative relationship with the Women's Flat Track Derby Association (WFTDA), encouraging its members to also become members of the WFTDA, and recognised the WFTDA Rules of Flat Track Roller Derby. Membership of the association was open to any UK roller derby league who met their criteria as long as all competing skaters met the WFTDA or Men's Roller Derby Association Gender Policy and were at least 18 years old on an adult team, and up to and including 17 years old on a junior team.

Mission Statement 
The United Kingdom Roller Derby Association (UKRDA) exists to lobby for and promote the sport of roller derby in the UK. We aim to help drive the growth, expertise and recognition of the sport, whilst supporting and encouraging our members to develop and grow individually into strong, athletic leagues.

Original member leagues 
In June 2010, the UKRDA was formally established and membership was granted to the following leagues.

Membership as of June 2021
The  organisation's membership list was last updated in June 2021, shortly before it disbanded.

Previous members

References

External links

Roller derby in the United Kingdom
2010 establishments in the United Kingdom
Sports organizations established in 2010
Sports organisations of the United Kingdom
Roller derby